Joan Jay was a singer and dancer at the Windmill Theatre in London, from 1936–1947. She was seriously injured there during a World War II bombing raid in October 1940, but returned to dancing after receiving skin grafts during a four-month stay in hospital. Her costumes were adapted to hide her scars.

She appeared as a castaway on the BBC Radio programme Desert Island Discs on 19 March 1942, described as a "glamour girl".

She had two daughters, Vivien (named after the Windmill's manager, Vivian Van Damm), and Janet.

References

External links 

 Page with photo of Jay

English female dancers
Year of birth missing
English singers